Najafabad (also Romanized as Najafābād) is a city and capital of Najafabad County, Isfahan Province, Iran.  At the 2016 census, its population was 293,275, in 90,158 families. It is located west of Isfahan and is increasingly becoming a part of the Isfahan Metropolitan area.

The city serves as a trade center for agricultural products in the region, and is noted for its pomegranates and almonds. One of the attractions of Najafabad is the "Arg-e Sheykh Bahaie" that has recently been repaired.

Najafabad was home to several gang activities, weapon sales and drug distribution systems controlled by notorious and unknown criminal system still being investigated by the authorities; their secrecy and network is still one of the most mysterious criminal organisations in Iran. In 2019 by the help of Irgc, Basij Mobilisation and security forces and Police some of the criminals were hunted down and executed but still not much informations is in hand about them.

Agriculture 
the city of Najafabad is known for its vast gardens, delicious food and friendly folk. It is home to many Iranian ethnicities but has a dominant persian population; plus lurs, Azeris, Iranian Georgians and Afghans.

Najafabad is not only a trade centre for towns near but also a cultural centre for people of Isfahan province. One of the few Iranian legal indie music festivals is held annually in Kharoun theatre in Najafabad.

Climate 
Najafabad has a cold desert climate (Köppen BWk).

Military presence
Najafbad is home to 8th Najaf Ashraf Division, which was highly involved in Iran–Iraq War. Also Saheb-a-zaman corps of IRGC is highly present as they have a stronghold in the eastern entrance of the town. Other notable military Basis are Quds stronghold, Ashura brigade and 3rd Imam Hossein and 2nd Imam Hassan paramilitary bases which makes Najafabad one of the most militarised cities in Iran; for each five Najafabadis there is one IRGC or police force present in the city or strongholds.

Notable names 
Najafabad is the birthplace of 
 Grand Ayatollah Hossein-Ali Montazeri
 Ebrahim Amini
 Mostafa Moeen
 Moein (singer)
 Gen. Ahmad Kazemi
 Mohammad Montazeri
 Ghorbanali Dori-Najafabadi
 Cpt. Mohsen Hojaji

Education
Najafabad is home to the Islamic Azad University Najafabad Branch, Payame Noor university of Najafabad, University of applied science and technology (Elmi-Karbordi) of Najafabad.

Najafabad is also home to famous Shahid Montazeri school. Also Imam Sadegh high school and Shahid Ezhei - Tizhooshan.

Gallery

References

 
Populated places in Najafabad County
Cities in Isfahan Province